Bubaridae is a family of sponges belonging to the order Bubarida. It has a cosmopolitan distribution.

Genera
There are six genera:
 Auletta Schmidt, 1870
 Bubaris Gray, 1867
 Cerbaris Topsent, 1898 
 Monocrepidium Topsent, 1898 
 Phakellia Bowerbank, 1862 
 Rhabdobaris Pulitzer-Finali, 1983

References

Heteroscleromorpha
Sponge families